The Roman Catholic Diocese of Moundou is a diocese in Moundou in the Ecclesiastical province of N'Djamena in Chad.

History
 May 17, 1951: Established as Apostolic Prefecture of Moundou from the Apostolic Prefecture of Fort-Lamy and Apostolic Prefecture of Garoua in Cameroon
 February 19, 1959: Promoted as Diocese of Moundou

Special churches
The Cathedral is the Cathédrale du Sacré-Cœur in Moundou.

Leadership, in reverse chronological order
 Bishops of Moundou (Roman rite), below
 Bishop Joachim Kouraleyo Tarounga (since June 3, 2004)
 Bishop Matthias N’Gartéri Mayadi (June 11, 1990  – July 31, 2003), appointed Archbishop of N’Djaména 
 Bishop Gabriel (Régis) Balet, O.F.M. Cap. (March 9, 1985  – September 18, 1989)
 Bishop Joseph Marie Régis Belzile, O.F.M. Cap. (December 19, 1974  – March 9, 1985)
 Bishop Samuel Gaumain, O.F.M. Cap. (December 19, 1959  – December 19, 1974)
 Prefect Apostolic of Moundou (Roman rite), below
 Fr. Clément Sirgue, O.F.M. Cap. (1952 – 1959)

See also
Roman Catholicism in Chad

Sources
 GCatholic.org

Moundou
Christian organizations established in 1951
Roman Catholic dioceses and prelatures established in the 20th century
Moundou
1951 establishments in French Equatorial Africa
Roman Catholic Ecclesiastical Province of N'Djaména